True to the Army is a 1942 American comedy film directed by Albert S. Rogell, written by Art Arthur, Bradford Ropes, Edmund L. Hartmann and Val Burton, and starring Judy Canova, Allan Jones, Ann Miller, Jerry Colonna, Clarence Kolb, Edward Pawley and William Wright. It was released on March 21, 1942, by Paramount Pictures.

The film was based on a 1933 play by Howard Lindsay that was based on the 1933 novel She Loves Me Not by Edward Hope. Paramount had previously filmed the property as She Loves Me Not (1934) starring Bing Crosby and Miriam Hopkins. 20th Century Fox remade the property in 1955 as How to Be Very, Very Popular.

Plot

Cast
Judy Canova as Daisy Hawkins
Allan Jones as Pvt. Stephen Chandler
Ann Miller as Vicki Marlow
Jerry Colonna as Pvt. 'Pinky' Fothergill
Clarence Kolb as Gen. Marlowe
Edward Pawley as Junior
William Wright as Lt. Danvers
William Demarest as Sgt. Butts
Edwin Max as Ice 
Arthur Loft as Ray
Gordon Jones as Pvt. Dugan
Rod Cameron as Pvt. O'Toole
Eddie Acuff as Sgt. Riggs
Edgar Dearing as Target Sergeant
Mary Treen as Mae
Selmer Jackson as Congressman
 Dorothy Sebastian as Gloria

See also
She Loves Me Not (1934)
How to Be Very, Very Popular (1955)

References

External links 
 

1942 films
1940s English-language films
American comedy films
1942 comedy films
Paramount Pictures films
Films directed by Albert S. Rogell
Films scored by Leigh Harline
Films based on American novels
Remakes of American films
Films produced by Sol C. Siegel
American black-and-white films
1940s American films